Jacky Teixeira (born 17 August 1975), known as Jacky Brown, is a French rapper, singer and presenter of the band Nèg' Marrons, of Cape Verdean origin.  He is a member of the group La MC-Mal Criado with Stomy Bugsy, JP and Izo.  He was also a presenter at the French cable network Trace TV, and aired "T.E.P.O.K." and on Skyrock with the program "Couvre feu".

He not only sung songs in French and partly in English, he also song songs in Cape Verdean Creole with the group Nég Marrons.

Discography

Group albums

Nèg' Marrons

Mc Malcriado
Nos pobréza ke nos rikéza (2006)
Fidjus di kriolu (2010)

Noyau Dur

Solo albums
Jacky Brown and Family vol.1 by  DJ Lord Issa & DJ Poska (2005)
Nos Probéza ké Nos Rikéza (2007)
Fidju di Kriolu (2011)

Other recordings and collaborations
 1997
 Passi feat. Jacky & J-Mi Sissoko 79 à 99 on the album Les Tentations by Passi
 1998
 Doc Gynéco feat. A.Speak, Pit Baccardi, Lino and Jacky: Menuet -  Album Les liaisons dangereuses by Doc Gyneco
 1999
 Compilation Garges-Sarcelles Ligne D
 Album Mixomatose by Gang Show lapin
 Album Sanction by Quartier Latin Académia
 2000
 Album Les Combinaisons by Janik MC
 2001
 Album Double Nationalité by Izé MC
 Album Manuscrits by Manu Key
 Compilation Nouvelle Donne 2
 Album Demain c’est Maintenant by Futurisitq
 2002
 Single Gladiator 2002
 Compilation Cap Sol with La Mc Malcriado
 Album Le Poids des Maux by Pit Baccardi
 2003
 Album Mobilizé by Izé MC
 Album 4e Round by Stomy Bugsy
 Compilation Fat Taf
 Compilation Dis L'heure 2 Zouk with La Mc Malcriado
 Compilation California Love by DJ Cream
 Compilation Four West Indies by Fabolous Prod
 2004
 Album Numéro D’écrou by Alibi Montana
 Compilation Dis L’heure 2 Zouk
 Album On ne Vit Qu’une Fois by Singuila
 2005
 Single Senegal Fast Food under the title La Triste Réalité by Amadou et Mariam
 Compilation Rap Attentat 3
 Compilation Neochrom 3
 Album Sorti de Nulle Part by Avo K Jims
 Album Dans Ma Bulle by Diam's
 Album Sombre Lumière by Larsen
 Album Sael & Friends by Sael
 Album Hors Série Vol.1 by Chrnonik 2H
 Compilation Savoir & Vivre Ensemble by Kery James
 Compilation Nuskool, La Relève R&B Vol.1 with N'Dee
 2005
 Album Street Show by Heckel et Geckel
 Album Le Jour G by John Gali
 Album Jusqu'au Bout du Tunnel by Mic Fury
 Album La Créme du Crime by Shone (Ghetto Fabulous Gang)
 Compilation Talents fâchés 3
 Album État Brut by Dontcha
 2007
 Album Discrimination Positive by Ghetto Diplomats
 Album Évolution by Passi
 Compilation Coupé décalé mania
 Compilation Latina fever volume 2 with La Mc Malcriado & Cubanito 20.02
 Album J'arrive by Dragon Davy
 2008
 Compilation Original Bombattah 2
 Album Selim S by Selim S
 2009
 EP Bientôt dans les Bacs vol.2 by Shaicho Black
 Album Au Clair Du Bitume by El Matador
 Album Um Flor Especial by Celia with La Mc Malcriado
 Compilation Passion Zouk 2009 with La Mc Malcriado
 Compilation Val D'oise Thugz"" by Rma2n
 Compilation Paris Oran New York by DJ Kayz
 Compilation Puissance Rap spécial rap français 2009 Compilation Fat Taf 2 Compilation Casa Aberta 2010
 Compilation Photo 2 Famille Compilation Lights Out All Stars with La Mc Malcriado
 Album Dieu Bénisse Les Voyous by Scalo
 2012
 La Voix Du Peuple (Voice of the People) feat Jacky Brown : single: La Parole Est A Nous de La Voix Du Peuple

FilmographyCouvre Feu (Cover Fire), Skyrock, 1996-2006T'entends pas ou Koi'' (Trace TV)

References

Living people
21st-century Cape Verdean male singers
Cape Verdean emigrants to France
French rappers
1975 births